The 1982 National League Championship Series was played between the St. Louis Cardinals and the Atlanta Braves from October 6 to 10. It was the 14th NLCS. The Cardinals swept the series in 3 games, and went on to win the World Series over the Milwaukee Brewers in seven games.

Background
Despite their history as the National League's most successful franchise – the second-most World Series titles in baseball behind the New York Yankees — this was the Cardinals first postseason appearance since the league went to divisional play. Their last postseason trip had been to the 1968 World Series when they lost to the Detroit Tigers — the last year before divisional play. The Atlanta Braves were making their first postseason appearance since 1969, the first year of divisional play. The Cardinals were led by Gold Glove first baseman and solid hitter Keith Hernandez, while the Braves were led by Dale Murphy, who was later named the season's MVP. The Cardinals had been the first team to clinch a playoff berth on September 27 while the Braves were the last to make the playoffs, clinching the West on October 3 when the Giants beat the Dodgers.

On a side note, Atlanta's manager Joe Torre and two of his coaches Bob Gibson and Dal Maxvill were known for playing for the opposing St. Louis Cardinal team while Cardinal coach Red Schoendienst previously played for the Braves and Cardinal coach Hub Kittle previously managed in the Braves organization.

Summary

Atlanta Braves vs. St. Louis Cardinals

Game summaries

Game 1: Take 1
Wednesday, October 6, 1982, at Busch Stadium (II) in St. Louis, Missouri

Game 1 was a wash—literally. The Braves led 1–0 behind Phil Niekro and were two outs from an official game when the umpire stopped it. When the rain did not subside, the game was postponed. Game 1 began from the start the following night in a match-up of the volatile Braves starter Pascual Pérez and longtime Cardinal starter Bob Forsch.

Game 1: Take 2
Thursday, October 7, 1982, at Busch Stadium (II) in St. Louis, Missouri

The new Game 1 was scoreless through two innings. In the bottom of the third, Willie McGee tripled and scored on Ozzie Smith's sacrifice fly to center. It stayed 1–0 until the sixth when the floodgates opened and the Cardinals scored five runs to finish off Perez and the Braves for the evening. Three straight singles by Lonnie Smith, Keith Hernandez, and George Hendrick chased Perez and made it 2–0 with two on and nobody out. Brought in to put out the fire, Steve Bedrosian walked Darrell Porter to load the bases and gave up a single to McGee that scored Hernandez. Ozzie Smith's single scored Hendrick and Porter scored on a sacrifice fly by Forsch. A wild pitch advanced the runners, and a Ken Oberkfell single made it 6–0 Cardinals. Donnie Moore replaced Bedrosian and ended the inning, but the game was as good as over.

The Cardinals added a cosmetic run in the eighth scored by Forsch on a sacrifice fly. The 7–0 win gave the Cardinals a 1–0 lead in the best-of-five series. Forsch went the distance and only yielded three hits while Perez got the loss.

Game 2
Saturday, October 9, 1982, at Busch Stadium (II) in St. Louis, Missouri

After another rainout the night before, an exciting contest unfolded at Busch Stadium in Game 2 with the Braves sending Phil Niekro against John Stuper. The Cardinals took a 1–0 lead in the bottom of the second when Ken Oberkfell scored on a wild pitch. The Braves answered in the top of the third when Bruce Benedict walked, went to second on a Niekro bunt, and scored the Braves' first run of the series that counted when Rafael Ramirez hit a single that he followed by scoring on a three-base error to put the Braves in front for the first time, 2–1. Niekro helped himself in the fifth when Glenn Hubbard singled, Benedict doubled, and Niekro's sacrifice fly gave the Braves a two-run lead. In the bottom of that same inning, Keith Hernandez singled and scored on Darrell Porter's double to make it 3–2 Atlanta. In the eighth, Porter walked, went to third on a George Hendrick single, and scored to tie it when Willie McGee hit into a fielder's choice that forced Hendrick at second. With the score tied, the Cardinals won in the bottom of the ninth when David Green singled, went to second on a bunt by Tommy Herr, and scored on a single by Oberkfell. The last at-bat win gave the Cardinals a 2–0 lead heading to Atlanta. Bruce Sutter got the win and Braves ace reliever Gene Garber got the loss.

Game 3
Sunday, October 10, 1982, at Atlanta–Fulton County Stadium in Atlanta, Georgia

In a must-win game, the Braves sent Rick Camp to the hill and the Cardinals countered with the sometimes volatile and often entertaining Joaquín Andújar. There were no runs in the first, but in the second, the Cardinals clinched the series. Hernandez singled, Porter walked, Hendrick singled to score Hernandez, and Willie McGee hit his second triple of the series to score two more runs. When Ozzie Smith singled to make it 4–0, Camp was history and for all intents and purposes, so were the Braves. In the fifth, Tommy Herr doubled and scored on a Hernandez single to make it 5–0. Facing elimination, the Braves fought back valiantly. Claudell Washington and Bob Horner both singled. Faced with the prospect of a big inning, manager Joe Torre pulled Washington and replaced him with the faster Terry Harper. But the next hitter, Chris Chambliss hit into a double play that scored Harper and made it 5–1, but took the Braves out of the inning since the next hitter was their star, Dale Murphy. Had Chambliss hit safely, a Murphy homer would have made it 5–4. Instead, Murphy singled with two outs, went to second on a wild pitch by Andujar, and scored on Glenn Hubbard's single. The scoring continued in the ninth when McGee drilled a home run off reliever Gene Garber to end the scoring at 6–2. Bruce Sutter got the save and Camp the loss. 

The win thrust the Cardinals into the 1982 World Series against another beer town team, the Milwaukee Brewers.

Composite box
1982 NLCS (3–0): St. Louis Cardinals over Atlanta Braves

Aftermath
1983 represented more promise and heartbreak for Atlanta. The Braves were 71–46 on Saturday, August 13, after beating the Los Angeles Dodgers 8–7 on a Bob Watson come-from-behind home run in the bottom of the ninth. The Braves were  games ahead of the Dodgers at this point and things were looking good for them. However, during next series with the Padres, the Braves would lose their cleanup hitter Bob Horner to a season-ending wrist injury. Horner was batting .303 with 20 homers at that point and his loss would prove to be a disaster for the Braves. After Horner's injury the Braves spiraled the rest of the way in August and early September and were soon overtaken by the Dodgers. With a chance to get within a one game of the now first-place Dodgers, Atlanta led Los Angeles 6–3 going into the bottom of the ninth during an afternoon game on at Dodger Stadium on Sunday September 11th. However, in what turned out to be one of the games of the season, Los Angeles rallied to win 7–6, thanks to an R.J. Reynolds' walk-off suicide squeeze and thus extending their division lead to three games. This effectively won the Dodgers the NL West, as the Braves were not able to make up the three games in the standings the rest of the way. Atlanta did not seriously compete again for the NL West until 1991, where they would this time best Los Angeles in a close race to the last weekend of the season.  

The collapse of the Braves '83 season was not the fault of Dale Murphy, who hit .327 in September with 10 home runs. He was rewarded with his 2nd straight National League MVP award, solidifying himself as one of the best hitters in the early 1980s.

From 1991-2005, they made the postseason every year. In comparison, in the Braves first 24 years in Atlanta (1966-1990), they made the postseason just twice (1969 and 1982).

Joe Torre would later manage the Cardinals from 1990-1995, before leading the Yankees to four World Series championships from 1996-2007. For his success with the Yankees, Torre was inducted into the National Baseball Hall of Fame in 2014.

The Braves would avenge their 1982 National League Championship Series loss 14 years later during the 1996 National League Championship Series when  Atlanta became just the sixth team in MLB history to come back from a 3-1 series deficit in the postseason. The two teams met again three other times during the postseason, during the 2000 National League Division Series, 2012 National League Wild Card Game, and 2019 National League Division Series, with the Cardinals winning all three match-ups.

References

External links
1982 NLCS at Baseball Reference

National League Championship Series
National League Championship Series
St. Louis Cardinals postseason
Atlanta Braves postseason
National League Championship Series
National League Championship Series
1980s in Atlanta
1980s in St. Louis
National League Championship Series